The 1981 All-Ireland Under-21 Hurling Championship was the 18th staging of the All-Ireland Under-21 Hurling Championship since its establishment by the Gaelic Athletic Association in 1964.

Tipperary entered the championship as the defending champions.

On 13 September 1981, Tipperary won the championship following a 2-16 to 1-10 defeat of Kilkenny in the All-Ireland final. This was their fifth All-Ireland title in the under-21 grade and their third in succession.

Results

Leinster Under-21 Hurling Championship

Final

Munster Under-21 Hurling Championship

First round

Semi-finals

Final

All-Ireland Under-21 Hurling Championship

Semi-finals

Final

References

Under
All-Ireland Under-21 Hurling Championship